Seán Buckley (born 1938 in Freshford, County Kilkenny) is an Irish former sportsperson.  He played hurling with his local club St Lachtain's and was a member of the Kilkenny senior inter-county team from 1957 until 1970.

References

 

1938 births
Living people
All-Ireland Senior Hurling Championship winners
Kilkenny inter-county hurlers
St Lachtain's hurlers